Susan Rolph (born 15 May 1978) is a female former freestyle and medley swimmer from Great Britain.

Swimming career
Rolph was one of the dominating forces in the 1990s of British women's swimming. Her Commonwealth Games medal haul consists of three gold, one silver and two bronze medals. She represented England in four events, winning a gold medal in the 4 x 100 metres freestyle relay, at the 1994 Commonwealth Games in Victoria, Canada. Four years later she represented England in five events and gained a medal in all five including two gold medals, at the 1998 Commonwealth Games in Kuala Lumpur, Malaysia.

She is a four times winner of the British Championship in the 50 metres freestyle (1994, 1995, 1997, 1998), four times winner of the 100 metres freestyle (1994, 1995, 1998, 1999) and the 200 metres freestyle champion in 2000. She also won the 50 metres butterfly title in 1994 and was six times champion in the 200 metres medley (1994, 1995, 1997, 1998, 1999 and 2000).

See also
 List of Commonwealth Games medallists in swimming (women)

References

 FINA athlete profile
 

1978 births
Living people
Sportspeople from Newcastle upon Tyne
English female swimmers
Swimmers at the 1996 Summer Olympics
Swimmers at the 2000 Summer Olympics
Female medley swimmers
Olympic swimmers of Great Britain
Commonwealth Games gold medallists for England
Swimmers at the 1998 Commonwealth Games
English female freestyle swimmers
Medalists at the FINA World Swimming Championships (25 m)
European Aquatics Championships medalists in swimming
Commonwealth Games medallists in swimming
Medallists at the 1998 Commonwealth Games